Koidula railway station is a railway station in Koidula, Estonia, on the Russian border. It merges the Tartu–Pechory and Valga–Pechory railways just before the Russian border (Pechory is located straight after the border). The station opened in September 2011, and is a few metres from the border with Russia. The main purpose of the station is making the crossing of Russian border easier for both goods and passengers. It also enabled the traffic on "Southeast Estonian Triangle" (Tartu–Valga–Piusa–Tartu) without crossing the Russian border. Currently however there are no cross-border passenger trains, and services from Pskov to Pechory do not connect with the Elron services in Estonia.

The station has up to two passenger trains a day to Tartu and Piusa, operated by Elron.

Freight volumes were reduced by up to 80 per cent due to international sanctions during the 2022 Russian invasion of Ukraine.

See also 
 List of railway stations in Estonia
 Rail transport in Estonia

References

External links

 Official website of Eesti Raudtee (EVR) – the national railway infrastructure company of Estonia  responsible for maintenance and traffic control of most of the Estonian railway network
 Official website of Elron – the national passenger train operating company of Estonia responsible for all domestic passenger train services in Estonia

Railway stations in Estonia
Setomaa Parish
Estonia–Russia border crossings
Railway stations opened in 2011
2011 establishments in Estonia
Buildings and structures in Võru County